Tetreuaresta spectabilis is a species of tephritid or fruit flies in the genus Tetreuaresta of the family Tephritidae.

Distribution
Bolivia, Brazil Guyana.

References

Tephritinae
Insects described in 1873
Diptera of South America